Bogu may refer to:

People
 Bogu Kailai (born 1958), Chinese lawyer and businesswoman
 Bögü Qaghan, third khagan of Uyghurs

Places
 Bogu (state)

Other
 Bōgu, Kendo training armour
 Bogu kumite in Bōgutsuki Karate
 Bogu kumite in Seikichi Odo